The Brandåa Hydroelectric Power Station is a hydroelectric power station in the municipality of Rindal in Møre og Romsdal county, Norway. Permission was granted for construction in 2006 and the plant came into operation in 2009. It is operated by Svorka Produksjon AS.

See also

References

Hydroelectric power stations in Norway
Rindal
Energy infrastructure completed in 2009